Cabarita Beach Surf Life Saving Club (SLSC), is a surf lifesaving club in Cabarita Beach, New South Wales, Australia. It is one of 10 such clubs in the Far North Coast.

History
Cabarita Beach SLSC was formed in 1963.

See also

Surf lifesaving
Surf Life Saving Australia
List of Australian surf lifesaving clubs

References

External links
 

Surf Life Saving Australia clubs
Sports teams in New South Wales
1963 establishments in Australia
Sports clubs established in 1963
Sport in Tweed Heads, New South Wales